The Oregon Trail 3rd Edition (full title: The Oregon Trail 3rd Edition: Pioneer Adventures) is the second sequel to the 1985 edutainment video game The Oregon Trail after Oregon Trail II. It was developed by MECC and released in 1997.

Gameplay
Like all other games in the Trail series, The Oregon Trail 3rd Edition requires careful resource management in order to successfully complete the perilous journey across America via the Oregon trail to the Western frontier.

The game included a guide book with helpful hints in case the player got stuck.

Reception

Game Industry News wrote: "I do find this game to be an excellent learning experience for players. It is marketed for people ages ten to adult, and even if you are an adult this game offers enough of a challenge coupled with entertainment to keep your interest". The Hour wrote: "This is an excellent role playing game for children ages 10 up to adults". Elizabeth Weal of the MacHome Journal said that "this upgrade of the simulation - with new full-motion video, improved graphics, and new players' decisions - makes the product even more engaging than its predecessors".

The 2002 book Designing Instruction for Technology-enhanced Learning suggested that edutainment properties that have been around for a long time, such as Where in the World is Carmen Sandiego? and The Oregon Trail "have been through many..evaluations, and the subsequent versions reflect careful attention to who is using the product and how well it sells". It cited the then-recent The Oregon Trail 3rd Edition (1997) and Where in the World Is Carmen Sandiego? (1996) as examples of this.

References

External links
 Broderbund (Riverdeep Interactive Learning Limited) page: OT3EPA DVD support, OT3EPA 1.0 support, OT3EPA 1.1 support, OT3EPA 1.2 support, OT3EPA 1.3 support
 Riverdeep Interactive Learning Limited page: OT3EPA 1.0 (School Edition) support
 
 Entry in CD-ROMs in Print
 Reference in The Complete Sourcebook on Children's Software

1997 video games
Children's educational video games
Classic Mac OS games
The Oregon Trail (series)
Video games developed in the United States
Video games set in the 19th century
Windows games
The Learning Company games